Vladimir Nikolayevich Golikov (born June 20, 1954) is a Russian former professional ice hockey player who played in the Soviet Hockey League.  He played for HC Dynamo Moscow. Inducted into the Russian and Soviet Hockey Hall of Fame in 1978, he is also the brother of another hockey player, Aleksandr Golikov.

Golikov played on the winning Soviet team in the Challenge Cup between the Soviet Union and NHL All-Stars. He also competed on the Soviet team at the Winter Olympics in 1980, winning silver in men's ice hockey.

External links
 Russian and Soviet Hockey Hall of Fame bio

1954 births
Living people
HC Dynamo Moscow players
Sportspeople from Penza
Soviet ice hockey centres
Olympic medalists in ice hockey
Ice hockey players at the 1980 Winter Olympics
Olympic ice hockey players of the Soviet Union
Olympic silver medalists for the Soviet Union
Medalists at the 1980 Winter Olympics